Mustafa Merry, also spelled Mustapha Merry (born 21 April 1958) is a Moroccan former professional footballer who played as a striker.

Born in Casablanca, Morocco, Merry spent his most of his professional career in France and was also part of the Moroccan squad at the 1986. He also competed for Morocco at the 1984 Summer Olympics.

External links and references

Living people
1958 births
Association football forwards
Moroccan footballers
Footballers from Casablanca
Moroccan expatriate footballers
Morocco international footballers
Valenciennes FC players
Ligue 2 players
Nîmes Olympique players
FC Rouen players
Olympic footballers of Morocco
Footballers at the 1984 Summer Olympics
1986 FIFA World Cup players
Calais RUFC players
SC Hazebrouck players
USL Dunkerque players
Olympique Grande-Synthe players
Moroccan expatriate sportspeople in France
Expatriate footballers in France
USL Dunkerque managers